Brenda Pérez Soler (born 27 June 1993) is a Spanish footballer who plays as a midfielder for Sporting.

Career

Pérez started her career with Spanish top flight side Espanyol, helping them win the 2012 Copa de la Reina de Fútbol. In 2015, she signed for Canillas in the Spanish second tier. In 2016, Pérez returned to Spanish top flight club Espanyol. 

In 2021, she signed for Sporting in Portugal, helping them win the 2022 Taça de Portugal Feminina.

References

External links

 Brenda Pérez at playmakerstats.com 

1993 births
Atlético Madrid Femenino players
Expatriate women's footballers in Portugal
Living people
Primera División (women) players
Primera Federación (women) players
Spanish expatriate sportspeople in Portugal
Spanish expatriate women's footballers
Spanish women's footballers
Sporting CP (women's football) players
Valencia CF Femenino players
Women's association football midfielders